Chal Parha was a 2013 Pakistani learning show airing on the GEO News, directed by Cyrus Viccaji and Omer Waiz and produced by Ali Shaan Khemani. Director of photography "Mohammad Kashif KT" Program is hosted by the singer turned social worker Shehzad Roy. Show is aired every Friday and Saturday at 7:30 PM on Geo News.

History 
On 7 February 2012 Shehzad Roy was invited onto Hamid Mir's talk show Capital Talk. Shehzad Roy gave details about his show which was based on a tour de Pakistan, and the team of Chal Parha visited some 80 cities all over Pakistan from Attabad Jheel and Gulmit to Gojal and Thar and film in more than 200 government schools to show the country the state of schools. Guests in the show were Nadeem Afzal Gondal Chan, Anusha Rehman Khan, Raza Hayat Hiraj and Shehzad Roy.

Plot 
In the first episode Shehzad was at Al Amyn Model School in Gulmit, Gojal. Second episode was about language instructions in the schools. Third and fourth episodes were about the punishment to students in the schools.

Cast 
 Shehzad Roy - host
 Iman Ali - cameo appearance (1st episode)
 Faisal Qureshi - cameo appearance (1st episode)

Soundtrack 

Chal Parha original title song is sung by Shehzad Roy, composed and music by Shani Haider and lyrics by Nadeem Asad. Song's video is directed by Saqib Khan.

References

External links 
 Official website
 
 

Geo TV original programming
2013 Pakistani television series debuts
Pakistani educational television series
Urdu-language television shows
Pakistani reality television series